Robert E. Gerber (August 1, 1916 – February 13, 2002) was an American basketball player. He played in the National Basketball League (an NBA predecessor) for four seasons following an All-American college career at the University of Toledo.

Gerber came to Toledo after a somewhat undistinguished high school career in Akron, Ohio. The 6'4 center/forward never lettered until his senior year at Akron South High School. However, he came into his own in college. He earned All-American honors in 1941 and 1942 and as a senior became the all-time collegiate scoring leader for the state of Ohio and broke the national college single-season scoring record with 532 points (both marks since eclipsed).

Following the close of his college career, Gerber played briefly with the Toledo Jim White Chevrolets of the NBL before joining the U.S. Army for World War II. Upon his return home, Gerber restarted his professional basketball career, playing three more seasons with the Indianapolis Kautskys, Toledo Jeeps, Minneapolis Lakers and Tri-Cities Blackhawks. He averaged 6.8 points in 93 NBL games.

After his professional career was over, Gerber settled into private life in Toledo, Ohio. He died of heart failure on February 13, 2002, in Sandusky, Ohio.

References

External links
NBL stats
Toledo Athletic HOF profile

1916 births
2002 deaths
All-American college men's basketball players
American men's basketball players
United States Army personnel of World War II
Basketball players from Akron, Ohio
Centers (basketball)
Forwards (basketball)
Indianapolis Kautskys players
Minneapolis Lakers players
Toledo Jeeps players
Toledo Jim White Chevrolets players
Toledo Rockets men's basketball players
Tri-Cities Blackhawks players